= Julor =

Ghanaian movie

- Directed by: Justice Ornan Abadah
- Starring: Jeffery Nortey Anthony Woode Sitsofe Tsikor Ben Affat
- Release date: 2019
- Country: Ghana
- Language: English

Julor is a 2019 Ghanaian movie directed by the filmmaker Justice Ornan Abadah.

== Plot ==
Aaron and Agnes are in an unhappy marriage. A thief breaks into their home, leading the couple to reveal their secrets.

== Cast ==
- Jeffery Nortey
- Anthony Woode
- Sitsofe Tsikor
- Ben Affat
